Local elections were held in San Pablo, Laguna, on May 13, 2013, within the Philippine general election. The voters elected for the elective local posts in the city: the mayor, vice mayor, and ten councilors.

Mayoral and vice mayoral election
Incumbent Mayor Vicente B. Amante is term limited. his party UNA nominate his son and city administrator Loreto Amante. his opponents are  former congressman in 3rd district and mayor Florante Aquino from PDP-Laban, former city administrator and vice-mayor Hizon Arago, father of Congresswoman Maria Evita Arago from Liberal Party and Incumbent councilor Angelo Adriano as an independent candidate.

Incumbent vice-mayor Angelita Yang will run as a reelectionist under UNA, her opponents are Restituto Mendoza, PDP-Laban's nominee, Former councilor and vice-mayor Frederick Martin Ilagan from Liberal Party, Incumbent councilor Alejandro Yu from Nacionalista Party, Edwin Gapunay and Michael Anthony Potenciano both independent candidates.

Results
The candidates for mayor and vice mayor with the highest number of votes wins the seat; they are voted separately, therefore, they may be of different parties when elected.

Mayoral and vice mayoral elections

City Council
Election in the city council is at large at 10 seats will be on the line.

|-
|bgcolor=black colspan=5|

2013 Philippine local elections
San Pablo, Laguna
2013 elections in Calabarzon